Alexander  Ezer (Yevzerov) (1894–1973) was a leader of the Zionist movement in Siberia and a proponent of expanding commerce, tourism and industry in both the pre-state Yishuv and the then-newly established State of Israel. Ezer was elected in 1931 to the 3rd Assembly of Representatives (Mandatory Palestine) ("Asefat Hanivcharim") representing the Revisionist Party of Ze'ev Jabotinsky, and later served as chief adviser on tourism for the first government of Israel.

Ezer was the chief designer of the Middle East pavilion at the 1939 New York World's Fair and the organizer of the 1928 and 1934 Levant Industrial Fairs (Levant Fair or "Yerid Hamizrach"). He was the founder of Binyanei HaUma and organized its first international exhibition, Kibush Hashmama in 1953.

Biography
Alexander Yevzerov (later Ezer), son of Miriam née Silifka and Manuel Yevzerov (the nephew of "Hamagid Hayadua" Yehuda Tzvi Yevzerov), was born on May 10, 1894, in Pryluky, Ukraine. In 1913-1915 he attended the Psychoneurological Institute in Saint Petersburg. In 1915 he  transferred to the University of Tomsk in Siberia  to complete his law degree.  In St. Petersburg he established a Zionist student organization called The Friend and was the editor of a magazine  distributed to Jewish students throughout Russia. Then, while living in Siberia, the Russian Revolution broke out, and Alexander was involved in Zionist activities and support for Jewish political prisoners sent to Siberia. The Bolshevik revolution and the oppression of Jews led Yevzerov to escaped from Siberia. He journeyed by trains, horses and seventeen days on a camel back through the Gobi Desert to reach Harbin, China in October, 1920, and then to Shanghai. He found a thriving community of Jewish refugees in China. Together with another Zionist activist, Moishe Novomeiski (Chairman of the National Counsel of the Far East Jews), Alexander Yevzerov establish the weekly periodical Siberia-Palestine that later was renamed Jewish Life; the publication continued until 1943 under the editorship of Dr. Abraham Kaufman. Alexander was also active in the "underground rail-road" to help Russian refugees in China get certificates to allow them to immigrate to the Land of Israel (which was under the British mandate at the time).

On June 12, 1921, together with 44 other members of the Siberian Zionist Organization, Alexander boarded the Lloyd Triestino Nippon cargo ship. After 40 days at sea they arrived at Port Said, Egypt and then took another ship to Jaffa, Palestine. In Jaffa Alexander joined the "Siberian Group" of new immigrants that set to pave the new road between Haifa and Geda and then built British constructions in Jenin. Laborers at that group remember Alexander as the crazy guy who after a long working day would march around the encampment reciting Russian poetry while others were entirely worn out trying to rest.

When Alexander fell ill with Malaria, he was sent to the hospital in Tel Aviv and fell in love with the nurse, which later became his wife, Rebecca Volkenstein (b. Chita, Siberia, 1897–1981). Rebecca herself was active in establishing the Hadassah Nursing School in Tel Aviv; she was the head nurse in that school and after moving to Jerusalem continued to work in Hadassah Medical Center and in other care centers until her 80s. Alexander and Rebecca had two children, Manuela Fuller and Gabriel (Gabbi) Ezer, 6 grandchildren and 14 great-grandchildren. In 1973, Alexander died after a long battle with cancer. Alexander and Rebecca are buried in Israel's Har HaMenuchot Cemetery in Givat Shaul, Jerusalem.

Promoting Industry
Alexander developed a vision of making Israel an industrial powerhouse. He began to organize local industrial exhibitions in 1923 and 1924, which later were expanded into an international Fairs, the 1928 and 1934 "Levant Fairs" (or Orient Fair). The symbol of the fairs was the flying camel, envisioned by Ezer and designed by the architect Arie Elchanani. These fairs grew rapidly: in the Levant Fair of 1934, 820 international companies were represented and 600,000 people from around the world came to see the public exhibitions. At the time, Tel Aviv was only populated by about 35,000 people. To accommodate the fair, Alexander and Meir Dizengoff (the first mayor of Tel Aviv) established the company "Mischar Ve Taasia" (Trade and Industry Publishing and Exhibition Co.), which purchased land north of Tel Aviv to develop the fair grounds. They also published a bi-weekly magazine, "Mischar Ve Taasia", starting in 1925, with Ezer serving as its editor. In 1927, Ezer published "Palestine from the Air", one of the first aerial photography ever taken in this region. Unfortunately, an Arab upheaval erupted in 1939, which made Tel Aviv a dangerous place for an international fair to be held. As a result, the Levant Fairs had to be canceled and instead Alexander organized the Middle-East pavilion of the 1939 World Fair held in New York City.

Origin of the Name Ezer
After Israel fought and won its War of Independence, Alexander Yevserov and his good friend Moshe Shertok wanted new names to go along with their new state. They decided to make their new names synonyms of each other. Shertok changed his name to Sharett, which means "to serve" in Hebrew. Yevserov changed his name to Ezer, which means "to help" in Hebrew. Moshe Sharett eventually became the first Israeli Minister of Foreign Affairs and the second Prime Minister of Israel after the first Prime Minister David Ben Gurion resigned.

Other work
Ezer's next vision was to make Jerusalem, the new capital, a center for commerce, industry and culture for Israel and the world's Jews. In 1950, he built the National Conference Center of Jerusalem (Binyanei HaUmah in Hebrew). Among the famous events held at the center were the Zionist Congress, a 1953's exhibition of Israel's achievements "blooming desert" and the 1958 exhibition for the 10th anniversary of Israel. Ezer helped in the publication of the first Israeli Encyclopedia, and he founded the International Club of Hebrew Literature. He thought that the best way to help the economy of the young state was to establish a strong tourism industry. He founded the Ministry of Tourism and became the first government adviser of tourism. Additionally, he authored books and newspaper articles about the history of the Zionist movement, politics, art, culture and more. He started a radio broadcast for Soviet Jews who under the communist regime were not allowed any communications with the outside world. His radio provided the Soviet Jews with  information about Israel in an attempt to contradict Soviet propaganda. His radio pseudonym was Asaf-Tal-Or, a combination of the names of his three Israeli grandsons.

Awards and recognition
He was listed as one of the 2,000 most influential men in the world and appears in Who's Who of World Jewry.
The mayor of Jerusalem Teddy Kollek gave him the honorary Medallion of the city.

References

1894 births
1973 deaths
People from Pryluky
Ukrainian Jews
Jews from the Russian Empire
White Russian emigrants to China
Chinese emigrants to Mandatory Palestine